Nor'easter or Northeaster may refer to:
 Nor'easter, a type of winter storm on the east coast of North America
 Nor'easter (American Horror Story), an episode of the television show
 Northeaster (painting), an 1885 work
 Fly – The Great Nor'easter, a roller coaster in New Jersey
 Nor'easter (band), an American contra dance band
 Nor'easter (film), a film by Andrew Brotzman